Milton Bororo Pessanha (born 11 November 1932) is a Brazilian former footballer who competed in the 1952 Summer Olympics.

References

1932 births
Living people
Association football forwards
Brazilian footballers
Olympic footballers of Brazil
Footballers at the 1952 Summer Olympics
Fluminense FC players
People from Campos dos Goytacazes
Sportspeople from Rio de Janeiro (state)